Kolesnikovo is a rural locality (a village) in Denisovskoye Rural Settlement, Gorokhovetsky District, Vladimir Oblast, Russia. The population was 29 as of 2010.

Geography 
Kolesnikovo is located 23 km southwest of Gorokhovets (the district's administrative centre) by road. Korovkino is the nearest rural locality.

References 

Rural localities in Gorokhovetsky District